Justine McIntyre is a Canadian politician, who served on Montreal City Council from 2013 to 2017. She represented the Bois-de-Liesse ward in the borough of Pierrefonds-Roxboro, as a member of the Vrai changement pour Montréal political party.

A graduate of the music program at McGill University, prior to her term on city council McIntyre worked as a classical pianist and as communications director of an organization for homeless youth, as well as serving on the board of a youth music education program.

Career
She was elected to Montreal City Council in the 2013 municipal election. She was most prominent as a voice on environmental issues, including banning the use of neonicotinoid pesticides in the city and opposing a controversial proposed new housing development in Pierrefonds West.

She became the leader of Vrai changement pour Montréal after Lorraine Pagé stepped down in 2015. She led the party into the 2017 municipal election, in which it ran candidates only in the boroughs of Pierrefonds-Roxboro, L'Île-Bizard–Sainte-Geneviève, Lachine, Saint-Laurent and Ville-Marie rather than the citywide slate of 2013. McIntyre herself ran for borough mayor of Pierrefonds-Roxboro rather than for Mayor of Montreal, but lost to incumbent borough mayor Dimitrios Jim Beis.

She makes regular media appearances, including on Radio-Canada radio and on Vaste Programme.

References

Montreal city councillors
Women municipal councillors in Canada
Women in Quebec politics
People from Pierrefonds-Roxboro
Female Canadian political party leaders
21st-century Canadian politicians
21st-century Canadian women politicians
Living people
Year of birth missing (living people)